Tzvetana Maneva (born in Plovdiv, Bulgaria on 30 January 1944) is a Bulgarian  actress. She was born in Plovdiv and her artistic career started here. The eminent Bulgarian actress made her debut in cinema in the 1960s and has appeared in more than 50 Bulgarian films.

Her parents are Nadejda Maneva and Georgi Manev. Her sister is Maria Kolarova, née Maneva.

Selected filmography
 Kaloyan (1963)
 The Swedish Kings (1968)
 The Last Word (1973)
 The Swimming Pool (1977)
 Don Quixote Returns (1996)
 Pod Prikritie (2011 - 2016)

External links

Actors from Plovdiv
20th-century Bulgarian actresses
21st-century Bulgarian actresses
Bulgarian film actresses
1944 births
Living people